The Diocesan Shrine and Parish of San Andres (Tagalog: Pandiyosesis na Dambana at Parokya ni San Andres), popularly known as Masinloc Church, is an 18th-century Baroque church located at Brgy. South Poblacion, Masinloc, Zambales, Philippines. The parish church, dedicated to Saint Andrew the Apostle, is under the jurisdiction of the Roman Catholic Diocese of Iba. The church structure, a standout among Spanish-era churches in the Central Luzon region for having been built with coral stone instead of adobe stone, was declared a National Cultural Treasure by the National Museum of the Philippines along with 25 other Spanish-era churches in 2001.

Parish history

The parish of Masinloc had its beginnings as a mission founded by the Augustinian Recollects in 1607, making it the first Christian Church in the province. It was founded by Father Andrés del Espíritu Santo with the guidance of Father Rodrigo de San Miguel, then vicar of the mission in Mariveles, Bataan, who urged the head of the religious group to set up a mission in the present-day site location of the town which was then abundant with plants locally referred to as hinloc. The original commune established by the Spanish friars is now barrios Bani and Tugui. For the majority of its early history, the church became the center of evangelization throughout Northern Zambales, even being named by a Recollect Chronicler as “La Mejor Iglesia y El Mejor Convento” (The best church and the best convent) in Zambales. Throughout the Spanish occupation of the Philippines, the parish of Masinloc was administered by the Augustinian Recollects (1607-1679; 1713–1902) and the Dominicans (1679-1713). The parish was also administered by the Columban Fathers (1951-2000).

In 2021, the Church was declared as one of the “Jubilee Churches” of Zambales in celebration of the 500 Years of Christianity in the Philippines. In same year, the Parish was declared as a Diocesan Shrine, making it the first Diocesan Shrine to be declared in honor of Saint Andrew the Apostle in the Philippines, and the 3rd Diocesan Shrine in the Diocese of Iba. The Elevation of the Parish took place on November 30, 2021 in a mass presided by Bishop Bartolome G. Santos Jr., during the 414th Religious Fiesta of the Parish and Town.

Architecture

Architectural history
The exact date of construction of the present coral stone church cannot be accurately traced, although some records tell that a certain Father Francisco de San Guillermo requested the construction of a church and convent in 1616 using materials that were also used in the construction of a fortification. Some sources suggest the date of the construction of the present structure to be as early as 1713, when the Augustinian Recollects returned to Zambales, from their mission in Mindoro. Another, more reliable source, suggests that the construction likely began around 1745. By the mid-18th century, major earthquakes brought damage to the church structure, leaving it unused for a couple of decades. In 1825, during the administration of Father Gregorio Miguel Jiménez, the church and convent were rehabilitated. By 1836, repair works done by Father Jiménez were continued by Father José de Aranguren; (later on, Father Aranguren would be installed as the Archbishop of Manila in 1846). From 1875 to 1877, major repairs on the church roof were executed. Father Juan Ortíz commissioned Architect Felipe Vera to replace the tile roof with nipa. Later on, Father Agustín Pérez had the thatched roof replaced with galvanized iron sheets. Father Pérez also built the bell tower in 1882 to 1883. A strong earthquake damaged the church during the administration of the Columban missionaries in 1970. A year after, Father Donald Dudea made major repairs to the damaged structure including the addition of the new belfry and several repairs on the façade. A magnitude 6.8 earthquake on December 12, 1999, damaged the church, particularly cracking a part of the façade. Restoration efforts were established soon after in time for the 400th jubilee of the parish.

Architectural description
The façade of the church is predominantly an Earthquake Baroque style with Neo-classic features. The front is divided into the triangular pediment, two horizontal sections and three vertical ones with an extended left portion forming the bell tower. It features saints’ niches on the first level, rectangular windows on the second, and an elaborately carved niche of the town's patron saint and carving of geometric shapes and medallions on the pediment. Triglyphs decorate the architrave between the second level and the pediment, giving the church a classical appearance. The belfry is designed like a circular template surmounted with a lantern and a cross.

Restoration and declaration as a National Cultural Treasure

The church was officially declared by the National Museum of the Philippines as a National Cultural Treasure on July 31, 2001. A church or structure can be declared a National Cultural Treasure if most of its features (both exterior and interior) from pre-1898 are still intact and if it showcases examples of local artistic style and technique. By 2003, various cultural and historical institutions in the Philippines like the National Commission on Culture and the Arts spearheaded the restoration of 26 churches declared as National Cultural Treasures.

Devotion to Saint Andrew the Apostle 

A 400-year traditional war dance, known as the Binabayani (a sambal word which means “bravery”), re-enacts the war between the native Aetas and Christians, and tells the story of how Masinloc came to be. Many versions of the story exist, but the most popular story tells of a fisherman who saw an image floating along the shore on top of a bell. When the image reached Masinloc, it refused to move any further. The townspeople tried to lift the image, but to their dismay, the Image was too heavy to move. An elder suggested performing a war dance between the Aetas and Christians, and miraculously, the Image became light enough to be brought to shore. The earliest recorded telling of this story was by  Capt. Florentino Elicaño in 1621. It is believed that the dance promises a bountiful harvest, and ensures a clear sunny day throughout the fiesta. Today, the dance is performed in front of the Image during November 2 to mark the beginning of the fiesta season, November 21 to mark the beginning of the Novena Masses, November 29 during the “bisperas” (eve) of the fiesta, and November 30 during the Feast day of Saint Andrew the Apostle. The binabayani also accompanies the Image during land and fluvial processions throughout the fiesta celebration.

A 12 versed traditional song is also sung throughout the Fiesta season, titled “Lilicot conan Patron Ama San Andres” which narrates the Martyrdom of Saint Andrew and his patronage to the town of Masinloc.

References

External links

Roman Catholic churches in Zambales
Spanish Colonial architecture in the Philippines
National Cultural Treasures of the Philippines
Spanish colonial infrastructure in the Philippines
Baroque architecture in the Philippines